Alan Herbert Preston (29 October 1932 – 2 September 2004) was a New Zealand football (soccer) player and cricketer who represented the New Zealand national football team and played 38 first-class matches for Wellington and two for the North Island.

Football
Preston made his full All Whites debut in a 2–1 win over Australia on 14 August 1954 and played twice over the next two weeks against the same opposition, losing both 1–4.

Cricket

A right hand batsman and right arm medium pace bowler, Preston played 38 matches for Wellington and two for a North Island XI against the South Island between 1955 and 1963. He averaged 24.54 runs in 69 innings, and had career best bowling figures of 3 for 32.

References 

1932 births
2004 deaths
New Zealand association footballers
New Zealand international footballers
New Zealand cricketers
Wellington cricketers
Association football forwards
North Island cricketers